Sagun Kamat (born 11 May 1983) is an Indian first-class cricketer who plays for Goa. On 21 October 2016, he scored 304 not out for Goa against Services in the 2016–17 Ranji Trophy. He became the first batsman for Goa to score a triple century.

See also
 List of Ranji Trophy triple centuries

References

External links
 

1983 births
Living people
Indian cricketers
Goa cricketers
India Blue cricketers
Cricketers from Goa
People from North Goa district